Annemarie Munk (born 25 March 1974) is a Hong Kong swimmer. She competed in four events at the 1988 Summer Olympics.

She was educated at Island School and Deerfield Academy, before enrolling at the University of Southern California.

She is currently co-founder, director and head coach of Swim Lab Asia, a triathlon and open water swimming coaching business. She is also a Board Member and Director of Programs for Splash Foundation charity, a swim school for the underprivileged and under-resourced community in Hong Kong.

References

External links
 

1974 births
Living people
People educated at Island School
Hong Kong female butterfly swimmers
Hong Kong female freestyle swimmers
Hong Kong female medley swimmers
Olympic swimmers of Hong Kong
Swimmers at the 1988 Summer Olympics
Place of birth missing (living people)